Statistics of Division 2 in the 1972–73 season.

Overview
It was contested by 36 teams, and Lens and AS Troyes won the championship.

League tables

Group A

Group B

Championship play-offs

|}

Promotion play-offs

|}

References
France - List of final tables (RSSSF)

Ligue 2 seasons
French
2